Principlists Grand Coalition is a principlist coalition and electoral list for the 2016 Iranian legislative election.

Member groups 
The alliance is mainly made up by the members of the 'traditional' parties Combatant Clergy Association and Islamic Coalition Party, the 'Transformationalist' Society of Devotees and Pathseekers of the Islamic Revolution and the radical Front of Islamic Revolution Stability.

Some principlists, most notably Ali Larijani and Ali Akbar Velayati, have declined to contribute to the coalition, since they believe the Front of Islamic Revolution Stability has too much weight in the alliance.

References

Defunct political party alliances in Iran
Electoral lists for Iranian legislative election, 2016
Principlist political groups in Iran